Xiangyin Confucius Temple is a Confucian temple located in Wenxing Subdistrict of Xiangyin County, Hunan, China.

History
Xiangyin Confucius Temple was first built in 1044, during the Northern Song dynasty (960–1127), and went through many changes and repairs through the following dynasties. Most of the present structures in the temple were repaired or built in 1744, during the ruling of Qianlong Emperor of the Qing dynasty (1644–1911).

Xiangyin Confucius Temple has been classified as a provincial cultural unit in 1983. The most recent renovation was in 2009. In 2013, it was listed among the 7th batch of "Major National Historical and Cultural Sites in Hunan" by the State Council of China.

Architecture

The Dacheng Hall is the main hall of the temple.

References

Bibliography

Confucian temples in China
Buildings and structures in Xiangyin County
Tourist attractions in Xiangyin County
1744 establishments in China
Religious buildings and structures completed in 1744
18th-century Confucian temples